William King McAllister (August 5, 1818 – October 29, 1888) was an American jurist.

Born in Salem, Washington County, New York, McAllister was admitted to the New York bar. In 1858, McAllister moved to Chicago, Illinois, and practiced law. He served as Recorder's Court judge. From 1870 to 1875, McAllister served on the Illinois Supreme Court. In 1875, McAlllister resigned from the Supreme Court to serve as an Illinois circuit court judge. He also served on the Illinois Appellate Court. McAllister died suddenly at his house in Ravenswood, Chicago, of heart failure.

Notes

External links

1818 births
1885 deaths
Politicians from Chicago
People from Salem, New York
New York (state) lawyers
Judges of the Illinois Appellate Court
Illinois state court judges
Justices of the Illinois Supreme Court
19th-century American judges
19th-century American lawyers